Live: I've Seen Your Face Before is a live album by US rock band 13th Floor Elevators. It was recorded during a show at the New Orleans Club in February 1967, Austin, Texas. The album was issued in the US and UK in 1988 by Big Beat Records (British record label).

Track listing
Adapted from Discogs.

Side one
 "Fire engine" (Stacy Sutherland, Tommy Hall, Roky Erickson) – 3:12
 "Tried to hide" (Stacy Sutherland, Tommy Hall) – 2:58
 "Levitation" (Stacy Sutherland, Tommy Hall) – 3:26
 "Don't fall down" (Roky Erickson, Tommy Hall) – 3:11 
 "Kingdom of heaven" (Powell St. John) – 3:37
 "You're gonna miss me" (Roky Erickson) – 3:43

Side two
 "Reverberation (doubt)" (Roky Erickson, Tommy Hall) – 3:26
 "Monkey island" (Powell St. John) – 3:00
 "Roller Coaster" (Roky Erickson, Tommy Hall) – 5:20
 "Splash 1" (Roky Erickson, Tommy Hall) – 4:20
 "She lives in a time of her own" (Roky Erickson, Tommy Hall) – 3:24

References

The 13th Floor Elevators albums